Don Frank Brooks (8 March 1947, in Dallas, Texas – 25 October 2000, in Manhattan, New York) was an American blues harmonica performing artist.

Career
Brooks was a full-time harmonica player with Waylon Jennings and was a prolific session musician with artists that included Jerry Jeff Walker, Judy Collins, Harry Belafonte, Carly Simon, Ringo Starr, Tim Curry, Bette Midler, Diana Ross, Billy Joel, Cyndi Lauper, The Talking Heads, Tim Hardin, The Bee Gees, Yoko Ono and the Plastic Ono Band, the James Gang.  He was an on stage musician on Broadway in Big River in 1985, and The Gospel at Colonus in 1988, and was heard for weeks on public television on Ken Burns' documentary series The Civil War.

He had attended the University of North Texas, where, among other things he had been founding member of the Folk Music Club.

He was known for his ability to bring out the best of the other performers he played along with.

Selected discography
 Mr. Bojangles – Jerry Jeff Walker (1968)
 Bein' Free – Jerry Jeff Walker (1970); 
 Don McLean – Don McLean (1972); 
 Feeling the Space – Yoko Ono/Plastic Ono Band (1973); 
 True Stories and Other Dreams – Judy Collins (1973); 
 Newborn – James Gang (1975)
 Judith – Judy Collins (1975)
 Main Course – Bee Gees (1975); 
 Bread and Roses – Judy Collins (1976); 
 Rumors – Arrogance (1976); 
 Songs for the New Depression – Bette Midler (1976); 
 Ringo the 4th – Ringo Starr (1977); 
 Kate Taylor – Kate Taylor (1978); 
 Guy Clark – Guy Clark (1978); 
 Peaks, Valleys, Honky Tonks & Alleys – Michael Martin Murphey (1979); 
 Loving You Is Where I Belong – Harry Belafonte (1981); 
 Read My Lips – Tim Curry (1978); 
 Max Morath and His Ragtime Stompers, Vanguard VSD79440 (1980); 
 Max Morath (piano, kazoo), Don Brooks (harmonica), Eric Weissberg (guitar), Bill Keith (banjo), Dave Bargeron (tuba, euphonium), Ron Traxler (Ronald E. Traxler; 1935–2008) (washboard, drums), Kenny Kosek (violin)
 Film scores of French composer Philippe Sarde: Le choc (1982 film) & J'ai Épousé une Ombre (fr) (1983 film); EmArcy (F) 532-000-0; 
 Why Do Fools Fall in Love – Diana Ross (1981)
 Hey Ricky – Melissa Manchester (1982); 
 The Bridge – Billy Joel (1986); 
 Naked – Talking Heads (1988); 
 Strange Kind of Love – Love and Money (1988); 
 Storm Front – Billy Joel (1989);

Selected filmography 
 Buck and the Preacher – (1972)
 Fame – (1980)
 Hors-la-loi ("Outlaws") (1985);

Family 
On December 14, 1973, Don Brooks married Anne Lorch (née Anne Lesly Zinman; born 1934), originally from Philadelphia, who, in 1964, divorced Jay Wintner Lorch (born 1930) of Dallas.  With their marriage, Don Brooks gained a stepson, Leonard Nelson Lorch (born 1959).

Death 
Brooks died of leukemia October 25, 2000, in Manhattan, aged fifty-three.

References

1947 births
2000 deaths
Musicians from Dallas
American harmonica players
American blues harmonica players
American country harmonica players
University of North Texas alumni
20th-century American musicians
Plastic Ono Band members
Deaths from leukemia
Deaths from cancer in New York (state)
American session musicians